AB Doradus is a pre-main-sequence quadruple star system in the constellation Dorado. The primary is a flare star that shows periodic increases in activity.

The primary star in this system spins at a rate 50 times that of the Sun, and consequently has a strong magnetic field. It has a greater number of star spots than the Sun. These can cause the luminosity of the star to appear to vary over each orbital cycle. Measurements of the spin rate of this star at its equator have shown that it varies over time due to the effect of this magnetic field.

The system has four components consisting of a pair of binary star systems separated by an angle of about 9″. The binary star AB Doradus Ba/Bb orbits the primary AB Doradus A at an average distance of 135 astronomical units (AUs). AB Doradus C is a closer in companion that orbits the primary at a distance of 5.1 AU, and has an orbital period of 11.75 years. 

AB Doradus C is among the lowest-mass stars ever found. At an estimated mass 93 times Jupiter's, it is near the limit of 75–83 Jupiter masses below which it would be classified as a brown dwarf. However, recent evidence indicates that the star may actually be a binary system itself, consisting of two brown dwarfs, AB Doradus Ca/Cb, with 72 and 13 Jupiter masses, respectively.

This system is a member of the eponymous AB Doradus Moving Group, a loose stellar association of about 30 stars that are all approximately the same age and moving in the same general direction. It is likely that all of these stars formed in the same giant molecular cloud.

References

External links
 http://jumk.de/astronomie/special-stars/ab-doradus.shtml
 

Dorado (constellation)
Flare stars
4
K-type main-sequence stars
M-type main-sequence stars
036705
025647
Durchmusterung objects
Doradus, AB